The Education Select Committee is a select committee of the House of Commons in the Parliament of the United Kingdom. The remit of the committee is to examine the expenditure, administration and policy of the Department for Education and any associated public bodies.

The chair of the committee is Robin Walker MP. Previous chairs include Neil Carmichael (2015–17) and Graham Stuart MP (2010–2015).

Membership

As of 13 March 2023, the membership of the committee is as follows:

Changes since 2019 
Occasionally, the House of Commons orders changes to be made in terms of membership of select committees, as proposed by the Committee of Selection. Such changes are shown below.

2017-2019 Parliament
The chair was elected on 12 July 2017, with the members of the committee being announced on 11 September 2017.

Changes 2017-2019

2015-2017 Parliament
The chair was elected on 18 June 2015, with members being announced on 6 July 2015.

Changes 2015-2017

2010-2015 Parliament
The chair was elected on 10 June 2010, with members being announced on 12 July 2010.

Changes 2010-2015

Publications

2017 - 2019 Parliament

2015-17 Parliament

Chair of the Education Select Committee

Election results
From June 2010 chairs of select committees have been directly elected by a secret ballot of the whole House of Commons using the alternative vote system. Candidates with the fewest votes are eliminated and their votes redistributed until one remaining candidate has more than half of valid votes. Elections are held at the beginning of a parliament or in the event of a vacancy.

See also
Select committee (United Kingdom)
British House of Commons
List of Committees of the United Kingdom Parliament

References

External links
Education Committee
Records for this Committee are held at the Parliamentary Archives

Select Committees of the British House of Commons